Flying Blind is an American sitcom that aired on Fox from September 1992 to May 1993. The series stars Corey Parker and Téa Leoni.

Synopsis
The series revolves around awkward post-collegian Neil Barash (Parker) who, by serendipity, meets beautiful libertine Alicia (Leoni) and begins a relationship with her.  The show explores the difficulties faced by self-conscious and repressed Neil in dealing with the erotic antics of Alicia and her eccentric roommates, Jordan (Robert Bauer) and Megan (Clea Lewis).

Veteran comedy actor Peter Boyle guest starred as Alicia's father, a former spy, and Charles Rocket had a recurring role as movie maker Dennis Lake. Thomas Haden Church, acting full-time on Wings, also served in a recurring role as Jonathan. In addition to Leoni, an assortment of stars had guest spots or cameos in the series before they became famous, including Diedrich Bader, Jill Hennessy, Greg Grunberg, Lisa Kudrow, Adam Ferrara, Andy Dick, Willie Garson and Noah Emmerich.

Cast
Corey Parker as Neil Barash
Téa Leoni as Alicia
Cristine Rose as Ellen Barash
Robert Bauer as Jordan
Clea Lewis as Megan
Marcus Giamatti as Ted Sharperson
Michael Tucci as Jeremy Barash

Production
The series was created by Richard Rosenstock, who later went on to write for Fox's Arrested Development. The theme song for the show was "A Million Miles Away", written and performed by David Byrne which appeared on his spring 1992 album release Uh-Oh.

The production companies were Sweetum Productions, and Paramount Network Television in association with (eventual corporate sibling) Viacom Productions. The series later became owned by CBS Media Ventures.

Episodes

Reception
The series got generally favourable notices upon its debut. Ken Tucker gave the show a B+ in Entertainment Weekly, "Flying Blind's pilot episode is so well written, so zippily sexy, that it immediately stands out among Fox's usual run of self-consciously crude comedies. But even if it soon crashes and burns, this pilot for Flying Blind is easily one of the best debut shows of the year." People also graded the pilot a B+ and stated "The show may never again attain the sustained comic brilliance of last week's pilot. But this is a rarity for Fox: a sophisticated and clever sitcom." Howard Rosenberg of the Los Angeles Times wrote "It's not only the episode's sharp writing but also its eroticism and its balance between the naivete and predictability of Neil and the spontaneity and instability of Alicia that give "Flying Blind" its uniqueness. What a nice beginning." Mike Duffy of the Detroit Free Press wrote, "Rosenstock has a terrific sense of irreverent non-sexist humor, the sort of contemporary, self-deprecating wit that makes Neil and the outlandishly attractive Alicia most enjoyable. Plus, Flying Blind stars Parker and Leoni share a very nifty comic chemistry in this hip, fast-talking and contemporary romance." The show only lasted one year and has never been released on DVD. Joel Keller of The Huffington Post remarked "I'm not sure why the show only lasted one year, given the talent both in front of and behind the camera (James Burrows directed some episodes, and Linwood Boomer was one of the writers). But when it was on the air, it was mostly an enjoyable show to watch."

References

External links

1990s American sitcoms
1992 American television series debuts
1993 American television series endings
Fox Broadcasting Company original programming
Television series about Jews and Judaism
Television series by CBS Studios
Television shows set in New York City
English-language television shows
Comedy television theme songs